In Greek mythology, the "Upper World" refers to the world where people live, in contrast to the Greek underworld—the land of the dead.

Locations in Greek mythology

References